Ferd. Thürmer Pianofortefabrik is a piano manufacturer in Bochum, Germany.

The Thürmer family have been making pianos for 150 years now and have their factory in Bochum, Germany. It was founded in 1834 by Ferdinand Thürmer. Run by Jan Thürmer, the company has had success after being rebuilt after World War II when the factory was expropriated by the Soviet occupation power.

Current Grand Piano Models

Current Upright Piano Models

References

External links 
 Official homepage

Piano manufacturing companies of Germany
Companies based in Bochum
Manufacturing companies established in 1834
German companies established in 1834